Chadkirk Chapel is a restored historic chapel near Romiley in the Metropolitan Borough of Stockport in Greater Manchester, England.  It is recorded in the National Heritage List for England as a designated Grade II* listed building.

History
There are records of a chaplain at or possibly from Chadkirk in 1347; however, the fact that the name incorporates the word "kirk", deriving from the Scandinavian word for a church or chapel, points to even earlier worship here, at a time when Scandinavian influence on the local dialects of English was strong enough for "kirk" to be a usual word for a house of worship.

The earliest part of the present structure is the half-timbered east end dating back, very probably, to the 16th century, the time of the Tudor kings and queens and of the Reformation, the break between the English Church and the Church of Rome.

In time, however, the chapel fell into disuse and decay. It passed through a succession of owners and is even reputed to have been used as a stable. Subsequently, it was used by Nonconformists but they were ejected during the reign of Queen Anne and erected a new chapel at Hatherlow, at the top of the hill overlooking Chadkirk; this church also became neglected and was "in a ruinous condition" until in 1747 it was taken over once again by the Church of England and substantially rebuilt in stone.

Further repairs were carried out at Chadkirk in 1761 and 1860. In 1876 there was a restoration when much of the furniture was removed.  The chapel was declared redundant in 1971 and was acquired by Bredbury and Romiley Urban District Council. In 1974 local government reorganisation abolished "urban districts" and the area was transferred to the newly created Stockport Metropolitan Borough Council.  The chapel was restored in 1995 and is now used as a wedding venue by Stockport Metropolitan Borough Council and is used for community events, meetings and activities – which are managed by the non-profit community organisation, the Friends of Chadkirk. The Friends of Chadkirk helps to manage, maintain and run the chapel and the estate within which it sits.

Architecture

The present building dates from the 16th century, although the south walls were rebuilt in 1747.  It is a timber-framed building with a slate roof but most of the walls have been rebuilt in dressed stone.  At the west end is a timber bell-cote with a pyramidal roof and a weather-vane.  The south wall of the nave has two doors and two windows with semicircular heads.  Above the west door is a gabled dormer window.  The chancel has a semicircular-headed window.  The east and north walls of the chancel retain their timber framing.  At the east end is a window with a semicircular head.

See also

Grade II* listed buildings in Greater Manchester
Listed buildings in Bredbury and Romiley

References

External links

Photograph by Craig Thornber
The Friends of Chadkirk

Grade II* listed churches in Greater Manchester
Former churches in Greater Manchester
Buildings and structures in the Metropolitan Borough of Stockport
Tourist attractions in the Metropolitan Borough of Stockport
Chapels in England